Battletoads is a 1991 action game originally released by Rare in 1991 exclusively for the Game Boy handheld game console from Nintendo. Despite having the same title as the original Battletoads game, Battletoads for Game Boy is a completely different game with unique levels. It was never ported to any other systems.

Gameplay

The player controls Zitz and it is only a single-player game. Zitz is given three lives and three continues to complete the game, after which he must start over. The gameplay is a mix of side-scrolling fighting and various vehicle races, ranking up to eight stages (nine if to also include the final showdown). As in the case of the original Battletoads, the Game Boy game is also notoriously difficult to beat, requiring fast reflexes, memorization of obstacles, and patience. However, there are many differences in the levels and they range in difficulty when encountering enemies or obstacles.

Almost every stage finishes with a battle against a boss, including known boss characters in the series like General Slaughter, Scuzz, Big Blag, General Vermin and Robo-Manus, who is this game's final boss. This is also one of the two Battletoads games in which the 'Toads do not have to confront the Dark Queen herself, although she still taunts the player in cutscenes before the levels in a similar fashion to other games in the series.

From the first stage, Zitz takes on some side-scrolling action levels resembling those found in the original game, with similar but improved graphics and enemies. Zitz' mission begins on Armagedda's surface, where Psyko-Pigs and rat-piloted UFOs roam about to destroy intruders. When fighting them, Zitz is capable of unleashing powerful Smash Hits to finish off weakened enemies, and there's also other "over-the-top" finishing combos that can also be found in this release. There are also many obstacles during the levels that involve skills outside of fighting. In the third stage in the dark caverns of Armagedda, Zitz must use the vines to swing across large gaps. Stage five poses a foot-race in a zig-zagging path in which Zitz must escape from a constantly rolling Brain-Damage Boulder while minding the sudden turns and not stopping. In stage eight, Zitz must keep balance and avoid obstacles as he runs around circular platforms in which there's a pseudo 3D effect of running around the platforms.

Vehicle stages also return in this game and put a stronger emphasis on memorisation and speed. In the second stage, Zitz must pilot a speeder bike through a deadly obstacle course. The speeder bike is armed with a laser cannon, allowing Zitz to shoot down incoming enemies and also battle Scuzz the Rat who appears piloting the Rat Rocket at the end, and must be shot down with extreme prejudice. Stage four has Zitz hitting the waves on a jet-ski, dodging logs and rafting Rats. Stage six has Zitz rappelling down the bottomless chasm, dodging birds, spikes, and Saturn Toadtraps. And in the penultimate stage, Zitz straps on a jet pack and flies high to the tip-top while avoiding barricades, laser beams, and enemies during the flight under a 99-second time limit.

Plot
Having taken a break from their adventures, the Battletoads Rash, Zitz, and Pimple spend some time in the Lost Vega system. The toads find themselves entranced by the alluring charms of an exotic dancer, but are ambushed when the dancer is revealed to be the Dark Queen. During the ensuing fight, Rash and Pimple are taken away to the planet Armagedda, with Zitz successfully escaping to the Vulture spacecraft of Professor T. Bird and leaving him as the only available toad to rescue his partners.

With aid in the form of briefing comments from the Prof and while also receiving taunts from the Dark Queen herself, Zitz wages a one-toad war on the Dark Queen's forces in planet Armagedda, ultimately culminating with a brutal showdown with the crazed biogen Robo-Manus. After he is defeated, Zitz succeeds in rescuing Rash and Pimple and the trio returns safe to the Vulture spacecraft along with Professor T. Bird. Though she does not face off the 'Toads in combat, the once again defeated Dark Queen swears to the heroes that she will be back with a vengeance.

Release
The game was released in North America in November 1991, published by Tradewest, and in Europe during 1992, published by Nintendo. Both of these releases feature the same cover art of the NES release of Battletoads. The game was released in Japan on January 7, 1994, published by NCS long after its western releases. The Japanese version portrays the same cover art as that of the Japanese version of Battletoads in Battlemaniacs, which was released in Japan the same day.

Reception 

GameRankings, a game review aggregator, assigned Battletoads for the Game Boy an averaged score of 77.67% based on three reviews.

Notes

References

External links
 Battletoads (Game Boy) at MobyGames

1991 video games
Battletoads games
Game Boy games
Game Boy-only games
Rare (company) games
Science fiction video games
Tradewest games
Video games scored by David Wise
Video games set on fictional planets
Single-player video games
Nintendo games
Video game spin-offs
Video games developed in the United Kingdom